Intel SHA Extensions are a set of extensions to the x86 instruction set architecture which support hardware acceleration of Secure Hash Algorithm (SHA) family. It was introduced in 2013.

There are seven new SSE-based instructions, four supporting SHA-1 and three for SHA-256:
 SHA1RNDS4, SHA1NEXTE, SHA1MSG1, SHA1MSG2
 SHA256RNDS2, SHA256MSG1, SHA256MSG2

x86 architecture processors

Intel 
The following Intel processors support SHA instruction set:
 Intel Goldmont (and later Atom microarchitectures) processors.
 Intel Ice Lake (and later) processors.
 Intel Rocket Lake (and later) processors.

AMD 
Several AMD processors support SHA instruction set:
 AMD Zen (and later) processors.

References

External links 
 New Instructions Supporting the Secure Hash Algorithm on Intel® Architecture Processors
 Intel Instruction Set Architecture Extensions
 , Chapter 8

Intel
X86 instructions
X86 architecture